The 1970 FA Cup final was contested by Chelsea and Leeds United. The match took place on 11 April 1970 at Wembley Stadium and ended 2–2, making it the first FA Cup final to require a replay since 1912. The replay was staged at Old Trafford and played on 29 April; after four hours of fiercely contested football, Chelsea eventually won 2–1.  To date, this is the last time both the final and replay were scheduled to be played in April; all subsequent FA Cup final ties have been scheduled to be played in May, with only the 2020 FA Cup final delayed and played later due to the COVID pandemic.

Leeds and Chelsea were two of England's top teams that season, having finished 2nd and 3rd respectively in the First Division. The match marked a clash of footballing contrasts: Chelsea were regarded as "flamboyant" southerners, whereas Leeds were seen as uncompromising northerners. Neither had won the FA Cup before, though both had recently been runners-up, Leeds in 1965 and Chelsea in 1967.

It was the only time between 1923 and 2000 that an FA Cup Final was played at a stadium other than Wembley. The replay attracted a British television audience of more than 28 million, the second highest UK audience for a sports broadcast (behind the 1966 World Cup Final), and the sixth highest audience for any UK broadcast. It has been ranked among the greatest ever FA Cup finals, and named as the "most brutal game" in the history of English football, due to the animosity between the two teams.

Road to Wembley
Home teams listed first.

Match review

Before the game
The final at Wembley was scheduled for 11 April, around a month earlier than was typical for FA Cup finals, due to the FA's wish for the England national team, who were world champions and were defending their trophy in Mexico, to have time to acquaint themselves to the Mexican climate. The Wembley stadium's pitch was in very poor condition with the Horse of the Year Show having taken place there a week previously.

Wembley final
In a game where Leeds were generally seen to have had the best of the play – with winger Eddie Gray, named man of the match, in particular giving David Webb a torrid time – the Yorkshiremen took the lead after 20 minutes when Jack Charlton's downward header from a corner did not bounce in the muddy pitch, defending Chelsea player Eddie McCreadie mis-timed his attempted clearance and the ball rolled over the line. Leeds appeared to have secured the game six minutes from full-time when an Allan Clarke header hit the post and Mick Jones reacted first to put the ball into the net, but two minutes later Ian Hutchinson headed in the equaliser from John Hollins' cross. There were no more goals scored during the 30-minute extra time and the two squads took a joint lap of honour.

The Wembley pitch, after the game, was in such appalling condition, as it was for much of the game itself, that the Football Association decided to stage the replay at Manchester's Old Trafford stadium.

Replay at Old Trafford
The replay at Old Trafford, watched by a television audience of 28 million, a record for an FA Cup final, became one of the most notorious clashes in English football for the harshness of play, which exceeded the previous game at Wembley. The referee in charge of both games, 47-year-old Eric Jennings from Stourbridge, in his last season as a Football League referee, allowed rough play by both sides throughout, playing the advantage to its full extent. He booked only one player, Ian Hutchinson of Chelsea, during the game.

Only one change was made in either line-up, with Leeds United replacing goalkeeper Gary Sprake with David Harvey.

Modern-day referee David Elleray reviewed the match in 1997, and concluded that the sides would have received six red cards and twenty yellow cards between them, in the modern era of football. Tommy Baldwin and Terry Cooper, admittedly two of the quieter men in the two sides, were kicking lumps out of one another, as the battle began. Not long into the game, Chelsea's Ron Harris caught winger Eddie Gray with a kick to the back of the knee, an action which neutralised the Scottish winger for the rest of the game. Norman Hunter and Ian Hutchinson traded punches while Eddie McCreadie, in his own penalty area, made a flying kick to Billy Bremner's head and Johnny Giles also lunged at a Chelsea opponent. Charlton kneed and headbutted Peter Osgood while Chelsea's goalkeeper Peter Bonetti was injured after being bundled into the net by Leeds' Jones, who, minutes later, shot past the limping Bonetti for the opening goal.

Chelsea equalised twelve minutes before the end, after a flowing move, from which Osgood scored with a diving header from a Charlie Cooke cross. Jackie Charlton should have been marking Osgood but had 'lost' him while chasing Hutchinson to exact retribution for a deadleg administered in the Chelsea penalty area a minute or so earlier. In scoring, Osgood became the last player to date to have scored in every round of the FA Cup. With the game ending 1–1, the final once again went into extra time. One minute before the first period of extra time was to end, Chelsea's Hutchinson sent in a long throw-in that missed almost every player in the penalty area but came off Charlton's head towards the far post, before being put into the unguarded net by Webb to give Chelsea the lead for the first time in the two games. They kept the lead until the end, securing their first FA Cup win.

Beyond the final
The two teams, at the time, were praised for their determination and for providing fans and audiences with two "splendid games", but there was also criticism among football professionals and media for the very physical play. In the modern era, however, the two games are often denoted as "epic" and "iconic".

In the following season, neither team would reach the quarter final stage of the Cup. Chelsea were eliminated from the competition in the 4th round, after losing 0–3 to Manchester City at home, while, in the 5th round, Leeds United were upset in a 2–3 away defeat by Fourth Division outsiders Colchester United.

Chelsea, however, went on to reach the final of the European Cup Winners' Cup, played in Piraeus, Greece, at Karaiskakis Stadium, where they faced Real Madrid. After yet another cup final that went into a replay, the first game ending 1–1 and the second one 2–1 to Chelsea, the English team won its first European trophy.

The Yorkshire side also succeeded in Europe, beating Juventus of Italy in the final Inter Cities Fairs Cup final. The score was 3–3 after completion of the two legs, Leeds winning on the away goals rule after a 2–2 draw in Turin. Liverpool had been knocked out by Leeds at the semi-final stage 1–0 on aggregate,

Match details

Wembley

Old Trafford

References

External links
Match report at fa-cupfinals.co.uk
Game facts at soccerbase.com
Replay facts at soccerbase.com
Game program for the Wembley final
Game program for the Old Trafford replay

Final
FA Cup Finals
FA Cup Final 1970
FA Cup Final 1970
FA Cup Final
FA Cup Final
1970s in Manchester
Sports competitions in Manchester